The Mammalian Genetics Unit was a genetics and genomics research institute in Oxfordshire.

History
Earlier research on the same site at the Radiobiology Research Unit, which opened in 1954, in the 1950s was into cytogenetics, where Charles Edmund Ford and John Hamerton confirmed on 12 January 1956 the size of the human genome. In the early 1970s this unit led research into mutagenic effects of radiation on the human chromosome. In the mid-1980s, important early work was done in genomic imprinting.

From 2007, the site no longer carried work into the effects of radiation on genes (radiobiology).

From April 2022, the site closed as the Mammalian Genetics Unit and was merged with the neighboring Mary Lyons Centre.

MGU
The MGU is largely derived from the earlier Radiobiology Unit (RBU). In 2010, work at the unit discovered that overexpression of the FTO gene led to obesity.

Structure
The unit is in Oxfordshire.

Function
The unit carries out work into genetics and genome engineering.

See also
 List of geneticists
 Environmental Mutagenesis and Genomics Society

References

External links
 Science Oxford
 Structure

1995 establishments in England
Genetic engineering in the United Kingdom
Genetics or genomics research institutions
Mammal genetics
Medical Research Council (United Kingdom)
Research institutes established in 1995
Research institutes in Oxfordshire
Vale of White Horse